Lena Asplund (born 10 October 1956) in Motala, Östergötlands County, Sweden, is a Swedish politician of the Moderate Party. She was member of the Riksdag from 2006 to 2018. Asplund is a member of the Moderates' party board and was also previously union chairman for the Moderate Party in Västernorrland. Asplund is married with 3 children and lives in Sollefteå, Västernorrland.

References

External links 

Lena Asplund at the Riksdag website 

Members of the Riksdag from the Moderate Party
Living people
1956 births
Women members of the Riksdag
Articles containing video clips
21st-century Swedish women politicians